Ernest Atkinson (birth unknown - death unknown) was a professional rugby league footballer who played in the 1900s and 1910s.

Playing career

Challenge Cup Final appearances
Ernest Atkinson did not play in Hull FC's 7-7 draw with Leeds in the 1910 Challenge Cup Final during the 1909–10 season at Fartown Ground, Huddersfield, on Saturday 16 April 1910, in front of a crowd of 19,413, this was the first Challenge Cup Final to be drawn, however he did play , i.e. number 5, in the 12-26 defeat by Leeds in the 1910 Challenge Cup Final replay at Fartown Ground, Huddersfield, on Monday 18 April 1910, in front of a crowd of 11,608.

References

External links

Search for "Atkinson" at rugbyleagueproject.org

Hull F.C. players
English rugby league players
Place of birth missing
Place of death missing
Rugby league wingers
Year of birth missing
Year of death missing